KUKU-FM is a radio station airing a Classic Country format licensed to Willow Springs, Missouri, broadcasting on 100.3 MHz FM.  The station is owned by Missouri Ozarks Radio Network, Inc. The station hosts a swap line weekly.

KUKU features top of the hour news programming from Fox News Radio.

References

External links

Classic country radio stations in the United States
UKU-FM